Ayatollah Sayyid Mohammad Hadi Ghazanfari Khansari (Persian:  السيد محمد هادي غضنفري خوانساري) (born 1957) is an Iranian Twelver Shi'a Marja'.

He has studied in seminaries of Qom, Iran under Grand Ayatollah Mohammad-Reza Golpaygani and Mohammad Ali Araki.

Notes

External links
آیت‌الله غضنفری خوانساری كاندیدای ریاست‌جمهوری شد
Personal website
حضرت مهدي (عج) موجود است نه موعود ! 
خوانسار

Iranian ayatollahs
Iranian Islamists
Shia Islamists
1957 births
Living people